The composer Christoph Willibald Gluck (1714–1787) is best known for his operas, of which he wrote 49 in all. His most significant and well-known work is Orfeo ed Euridice.



List

References

Sources

External links

 
Lists of operas by composer
Lists of compositions by composer